TeraCopy is a freemium file transfer utility designed as an alternative for the built-in Windows Explorer file transfer feature. Its focus is data integrity, file transfer reliability and the ability to pause or resume file transfers.

Design 

TeraCopy uses dynamically adjusted buffers to reduce seek times. Asynchronous copy speeds up file transfer between two physical hard drives. The processes can be paused or resumed.

In case of transfer errors, TeraCopy will try several times; after that, it skips the faulty file and proceeds with the rest of the operation. TeraCopy also shows failed file transfers and allows the user to fix the problem and recopy the problematic files. TeraCopy offers no explanation for skipped files; it simply reports them as "Skipped".  It may skip copying for numerous reasons that the user could correct if they were known, such as a too-long file name.

TeraCopy can replace Windows Explorer's copy and move functions. The author asserts that it has full Unicode support.

Licensing 

TeraCopy is an example of the freemium licensing model. A basic edition is offered as freeware but may only be used in non-commercial environments. TeraCopy Pro, a shareware version of the utility, adds additional features such as having a list of favorite folders to be used as a copy destination and the ability to modify the copy queue.

Reception 

In 2007, Ionut Ilascu from Softpedia.com commended the utility on its ability for its error recovery functionality and concluded "TeraCopy is a lot faster than Windows Explorer on XP is, but only with proper defragmentation. On Vista, it moves a tad slower even if defragmentation of the disk has been performed."

In 2009 Jason Fitzpatrick from Lifehacker praised the usability by stating "It doesn't overwhelm you with a plethora of settings or options" and also called it "just advanced enough." Subsequently, Lifehacker visitors voted TeraCopy by a large margin as the best Windows file copier out of four other contestants.

In a 2010 review, CNET called it a "nifty piece of freeware" and recommended it for all Windows users.

See also 
 List of file copying software

References

External links 

 

File copy utilities
2007 software
Windows-only shareware
Windows-only freeware
Utilities for Windows